Alan A. Armer (7 July 1922 – 5 December 2010) was an American television producer, best known for his Emmy-award winning tenure as the producer of The Fugitive. He also produced The Invaders, The Untouchables and the first year of Cannon.

Early life
Born in Los Angeles, Armer received a bachelor's degree in speech and drama from Stanford University, a master's degree in theatre arts from UCLA and an honorary doctoral degree from California State University, Northridge.

Career
After college, Armer started his entertainment career at a radio station in San Jose where he worked as an announcer. After moving back to Los Angeles in search of a radio job, Armer began working at an advertising agency that specialized in television ads. In that role, Armer later wrote, acted in, directed, narrated and edited television commercials. From there, Armer and a relative by marriage Walter Grauman developed their own television show, Lights, Camera, Action, which aired on NBC affiliate KNBH for three years. He later was hired by the station as a floor manager and then director. He later went on to 20th Century Fox, where he produced several television series, including My Friend Flicka and Broken Arrow.

Armer later became executive producer for The Untouchables. He joined QM Productions where he produced The Fugitive for which he received the Television Academy's Emmy Award, The Invaders, and the first year of Cannon. For his work on The Fugitive, Armer won a 1965 Edgar Award from the Mystery Writers of America, a "Most Popular Series" award from TV Guide Magazine and a Producers Guild Award.  He later became a member of the Producers Guild's Television Hall of Fame.  In 1980, he became a part-time faculty member at California State University, Northridge, and eventually became a full professor and head of the Screenwriting Option, of the Cinema and Television Arts Department.  Armer taught directing, as well as all levels of screenwriting.

Death
Armer died of colon cancer on December 5, 2010 at his Century City, California home.

References

External links
 
 

1922 births
2010 deaths
American television writers
American male television writers
Television producers from California
American television directors
Writers from Los Angeles
Edgar Award winners
Screenwriting instructors
Stanford University School of Humanities and Sciences alumni
Deaths from colorectal cancer
Deaths from cancer in California
University of California, Los Angeles alumni
Screenwriters from California